The Men’s Singles tournament of the 2006 BCR Open Romania tennis championship took place in Bucharest, Romania, between 11 September and 17 September 2006. 32 players from 13 countries competed in the 5-round tournament. The final winner was Jürgen Melzer of Austria, who defeated Filippo Volandri of Italy. The defending champion from 2005, Florent Serra, lost in the semifinals to Volandri.

Seeds

Draw

Finals

Top half

Bottom half

References

External links
Draw
Qualifying draw

Romanian Open
2006 in Romanian tennis